Neopaganism in Ireland:
Neo-paganism in the Republic of Ireland
 See Neopaganism in the United Kingdom for Neopaganism in Northern Ireland .